Jerome Francis "Jud" McAtee (February 5, 1920 – February 22, 2011) was a Canadian ice hockey player who played 46 games in the National Hockey League with the Detroit Red Wings between 1942 and 1945.

Playing career
Born in Stratford, Ontario, he and his brother Norm played together in junior ice hockey with the Oshawa Generals during the years when the Generals dominated the Ontario Hockey League, winning championships with them in both 1938–39 and 1939–40. In 1939–40, Jud led the league with 25 goals and 44 points before signing as a free agent with the Red Wings in the NHL after the season. During World War II. Jud played for the Red Wings in parts of three seasons (1942–43, 1943–44 and 1944–45), scoring 15 goals and 13 assists during the regular season and also participating in all 14 playoff games in his third season (2 goals, 1 assist) while forming a line with Syd Howe and Mud Bruneteau. During December 1945, Jud and Norm were both traded by the Red Wings to Chicago for Doug McCaig, and Jud never again played in the NHL. He ended up finishing his career in the minor leagues and retired from the Tulsa Oilers in 1950.

Personal life
He was married to his wife Opal until her death on February 1, 1987, and never remarried.

He died in Tulsa, Oklahoma, on February 22, 2011, less than a year after his brother Norm's death on August 25, 2010.

Career statistics

Regular season and playoffs

References

External links
 

1920 births
2011 deaths
Canadian expatriates in the United States
Canadian ice hockey centres
Detroit Red Wings players
Hershey Bears players
Ice hockey people from Ontario
Indianapolis Capitals players
Ontario Hockey Association Senior A League (1890–1979) players
Oshawa Generals players
St. Louis Flyers players
Sportspeople from Stratford, Ontario
Tulsa Oilers (USHL) players